Igor Ivanovich Rogov (Russian and Kazakh: Игорь Иванович Рогов) (born 17 May 1950) is a Kazakhstani lawyer, former  Minister of Justice of Kazakhstan and present Chairman of the Constitutional Council of Kazakhstan. Born in Baku, Rogov has degrees in jurisprudence and criminology. He has worked in academia. In 2000, he became the Minister of Justice for Kazkhstan.

References

Justice ministers
1950 births
Living people
Politicians from Baku
Government ministers of Kazakhstan
Al-Farabi Kazakh National University alumni